Kamiah is a city in Lewis and Idaho counties in the U.S. state of Idaho. The largest city in Lewis County, it extends only a small distance into Idaho County, south of Lawyer Creek.  The population was 1,295 at the 2010 census, up from 1,160 in 2000. The city lies in the narrow valley of the Clearwater River; downstream are Orofino and Lewiston, at the confluence with the Snake River.

History

The Kamiah area has been inhabited by the Nez Perce for centuries. The name "Kamiah" is Nez Perce for "many rope litters," as Nez Perce manufactured "Kamia" ropes in the area to fish steelhead. Also according to Nez Perce tradition, the Appaloosa horse was first bred in the area.

On their return trip east, the Lewis and Clark Expedition camped in the Kamiah area for several weeks during the spring of 1806, waiting for snows to melt.

Kamiah is the character name of the Nez Perce/Blackfoot woman in Across the Wide Missouri, a 1951 'mountain men' film set in the 1830s. Similar in fame to Sacagawea of the Lewis & Clark expedition, Kamiah led her associated mountain men's troop over the Bitterroot Range to her homeland (Three Forks, Montana for Sacagawea).

Hohots Ilppilp was the leader around Kamiah from at least the time of Lewis and Clark until the 1840s. When the first leader for all the Nez Perce was appointed, it was Hohots Ilppilp's grandson Ellis who lived in this area and maintained large herds of sheep, cattle and over a thousand horses.

Kamiah is within the Nez Perce Indian Reservation. Similar to the opening of lands in Oklahoma, the U.S. government opened the reservation for white settlement  in November 1895. The proclamation had been signed less than two weeks earlier by President Cleveland.

Geography

The city is located at the confluence of Lawyer Creek and the Clearwater River on the left bank of the latter. In the Kamiah area, the Lewis-Idaho County line follows Lawyer Creek to its confluence with the Clearwater, and then turns to follow the Clearwater. U.S. Route 12 passes through Kamiah, crossing from the right to left bank of the Clearwater at the city. The two streams cut deep and narrow valleys through the otherwise relatively flat, rolling Camas Prairie region that surrounds Kamiah. The city is located at 1,250 feet above sea level, but elevations of over 2,800 feet on the prairie lie within three miles of Kamiah.

In addition to U.S. Route 12, transportation links to Kamiah are provided by Idaho State Highway 64 and Idaho State Highway 162.

Climate
According to the Köppen climate classification system, Kamiah has a hot-summer continental climate (Köppen Dfa).

Demographics

2010 census
As of the census of 2010, there were 1,295 people, 596 households, and 325 families residing in the city. The racial makeup of the city was 82.2% White, 0.4% African American, 8.9% Native American, 0.7% Asian, 0.3% Pacific Islander, 3.7% from other races, and 3.9% from two or more races. Hispanic or Latino of any race were 5.5% of the population.

There were 596 households, of which 25.0% had children under the age of 18 living with them, 39.1% were married couples living together, 9.6% had a female householder with no husband present, 5.9% had a male householder with no wife present, and 45.5% were non-families. 39.9% of all households were made up of individuals, and 22.1% had someone living alone who was 65 years of age or older. The average household size was 2.17 and the average family size was 2.91.

The median age in the city was 45.7 years. 23.9% of residents were under the age of 18; 5.7% were between the ages of 18 and 24; 19.7% were from 25 to 44; 26.7% were from 45 to 64; and 24% were 65 years of age or older. The gender makeup of the city was 48.3% male and 51.7% female.

2000 census
As of the census of 2000, there were 1,160 people, 531 households, and 302 families residing in the city. The racial makeup of the city was 88.88% White, 0.26% African American, 8.02% Native American, 0.34% Asian, 0.09% Pacific Islander, 1.47% from other races, and 0.95% from two or more races. Hispanic or Latino of any race were 4.14% of the population.

There were 531 households, out of which 22.2% had children under the age of 18 living with them, 44.6% were married couples living together, 9.2% had a female householder with no husband present, and 43.1% were non-families. 38.4% of all households were made up of individuals, and 23.5% had someone living alone who was 65 years of age or older.  The average household size was 2.17 and the average family size was 2.87.

In the city, the population was spread out, with 24.0% under the age of 18, 6.0% from 18 to 24, 20.9% from 25 to 44, 26.1% from 45 to 64, and 23.0% who were 65 years of age or older.  The median age was 44 years. For every 100 females, there were 88.0 males.  For every 100 females age 18 and over, there were 83.8 males.

The median income for a household in the city was $21,793, and the median income for a family was $33,424. Males had a median income of $25,982 versus $19,688 for females. The per capita income for the city was $14,111.  About 12.5% of families and 18.5% of the population were below the poverty line, including 22.6% of those under age 18 and 12.2% of those age 65 or over.

Economy
The city's largest employer was the Three Rivers Timber sawmill, which employed 108 before its closure in late 2008. After nearly two years, the mill was sold and restarted in August 2010 as Blue North Forest Products.

Notable people
Chief Lawyer, Nez Perce leader, is buried at Nikesa Cemetery in East Kamiah
Ken Hobart, former CFL quarterback, graduated from Kamiah High School in 1979

References

External links
 City of Kamiah official website
 Kamiah Chamber of Commerce

Cities in Idaho
Cities in Lewis County, Idaho
Cities in Idaho County, Idaho